Isabella Bertold  (born 4 February 1991) is a Canadian sailor and cyclist, who competes in the Laser radial class in sailing, and who currently rides for UCI Women's Continental Team  in cycling. She has been ranked in the top 10 of the world in sailing. She lives in Vancouver, British Columbia.

Career 
After a successful youth and junior careers, she finished 7th at the 2013 World Laser Radial Women's Championship. She was named Sail Canada 2013 Female Athlete of the Year. She placed 18th at the 2014 ISAF Sailing World Championships and 15th at the Olympic qualification ranking to earn a quota at the 2016 Summer Olympics for Canada. She has won many World Cup and international medals events. She has been ranked consistently in the top 10 of the world between 2012 and 2015, reaching world number 2 at her best.

References

External links 

1991 births
Living people
Canadian female cyclists
Canadian female sailors (sport)